A list of horror films released in 2004.

References

Lists of horror films by year
2004-related lists